The Oklahoma Sooners softball team represents the University of Oklahoma in NCAA Division I College softball. The team competes in the Big 12 Conference, and plays its home games at OU Softball Complex in Norman, Oklahoma. The Sooners are currently led by head coach Patty Gasso.

Oklahoma has won their conference title 14 times, has been to the NCAA Tournament 27 times, has been to the NCAA Women's College World Series 15 times, and has won the NCAA championship six times. Oklahoma also appeared in the AIAW Women's College World Series four times.

History

The Sooners won their first national championship back in 2000. They swept Harvard, Cal-State Northridge, and Oregon State at their home regionals to advance to their first appearance in the Women's College World Series. They beat California and knocked off Southern Mississippi and Arizona to advance to the championship game against UCLA. They beat UCLA 3-1 to capture their first national title.

They hosted and won their 2013 regional. They beat Marist and Arkansas with a combined score of 41-6. They hosted again their super regionals against Texas A&M where they outscored the Aggies 18-2. In Oklahoma City, they went through 8 seeded Michigan, #10 ranked Texas, and #11 ranked Washington to reach Tennessee in the championship. Game 1 was where Lauren Chamberlain hit her iconic two-run walk-off home run after 12 innings of play. In game 2, Keilani Ricketts drove in all four runs, and Michelle Gascoigne pitched a shut out to obtain their second national title.

Once again, they hosted their regional in 2016 where they beat Wichita State and Ole Miss. They went on to host their super regional against Louisiana-Lafayette where they swept to advance to the Women's College World Series once again. In their first game in the tournament, they beat Alabama in extra innings. They faced #12 Michigan in game 2, and beat LSU in their third to face Auburn in the championship. They won 2-1 in their final game where Paige Parker threw a complete game.

In 2017, Sooners hosted another straight regional and won against North Dakota State, Arkansas, and Tulsa. From there, they went to #7 Auburn for the Super Regionals where they won in two games. They held off Baylor in Oklahoma City, overcame #6 Washington, and beat Oregon to face Florida in the finals. They won game 1 in the longest game ever played in the finals in 17 innings. They finished off the series with a swept to capture their fourth national championship.

In 2021, the Sooners hosted their regional as the No. 1 overall seed and beat Wichita State, Texas A&M, and Morgan State. They advanced to host their super regional against Washington, which they won in two games. At the Women's College World Series, they lost their first round game to James Madison University; subsequently, they won four straight elimination games to advance to the championship series, besting Georgia, UCLA, and James Madison twice. In the championship series, they lost their first game to Florida State, but returned to win games two and three to claim their fifth national championship.

Love's Field
On October 28, 2021, it was announced a new softball stadium, Love's Field, is planned to break ground in 2022 and open before the 2024 season. Love's provided the naming gift following a $9 million donation. The estimated cost for the project is $27 million. The overall square footage of the complex will be 44,000 square feet and will have a seating capacity of 3,000.

Coaching history

Championships

National championships

Conference championships

Conference tournament championships

NCAA Tournament seeding history
National seeding began in 2005. The Oklahoma Sooners have been a national seed 16 of the 17 tournaments.

Records and results

Year-by-year results

Records by opponent
Sources:
Big 12 Conference opponents

Former Big 12 Conference opponents

Major Non-Conference opponents

College World Series
Oklahoma has made 15 trips to the Women's College World Series, winning the title in 2000, 2013, 2016, 2017, 2021 and 2022. OU finished as runner-up in 2012 and 2019.

2023 Coaching Staff

Individual honours
This is a list of individual honors at the national and conference levels, including All-Americans.

National honours

Conference honours

All-Americans
1999

 Lynette Velazquez

2000

 Ashli Barrett	
 Lisa Carey

2001

 Kelli Braitsch

2003

 Leah Gulla

2004

 Heather Scaglione	

2005

 Heather Scaglione	

2006

 Kristin Vesley	

2007

 Norrelle Dickson	

2009

 Amber Flores	

2010

 Amber Flores	

2011

 Keilani Ricketts	

2012

 Lauren Chamberlain
 Keilani Ricketts
 Jessica Shults

2013

 Lauren Chamberlain
 Keilani Ricketts

2014

 Shelby Pendley

2015

 Lauren Chamberlain
 Shelby Pendley

2016

 Paige Parker

2018

 Jocelyn Alo
 Sydney Romero
 Paige Parker

2019

 Caleigh Clifton
 Sydney Romero
 Giselle Juarez

2021

 Jocelyn Alo
 Jayda Coleman
 Tiare Jennings

2022

 Jocelyn Alo
 Jordy Bahl
 Jayda Coleman
 Tiare Jennings 
 Grace Lyons

References

 
